Christopher Douglas Kenady (born April 10, 1973 in Mound, Minnesota) is a retired professional ice hockey player who played seven games in the National Hockey League.  He played for the New York Rangers and St. Louis Blues.

He played his college hockey at the University of Denver

External links 

1973 births
Living people
People from Mound, Minnesota
American men's ice hockey right wingers
Hartford Wolf Pack players
New York Rangers players
St. Louis Blues draft picks
St. Louis Blues players
Ice hockey players from Minnesota